Brian Casey may refer to:

Brian Casey (academic), president of Colgate University
Brian Casey (ice hockey) (born 1973), Canadian ice hockey player
Brian Casey, musician with Jagged Edge